Gordon McPherson (born 1965) is a Scottish composer.

McPherson was born in Dundee. He studied at the University of York, England, returning there for his doctorate, continuing with post-doctoral research at the Royal Northern College of Music.

MacPherson has composed almost 100 pieces (as of 2006). His work has been performed and broadcast widely throughout the world. Recent works have included Kamperduin, a second work for the Royal Scottish National Orchestra, commissioned to commemorate the 200th anniversary of the 1797 Battle of Camperdown; Friends in Strange Places, a new chamber work recorded for the inauguration of Dundee Contemporary Arts; a second study for guitar, Miami, premiered at the Wigmore Hall in 1998 and Detours, commissioned by the Hebrides Ensemble.

The Baby Bear's Bed for Icebreaker was premiered in Vienna in October 1999 and has subsequently received performances in Belgium, the Netherlands, Slovakia and the United Kingdom. It has also been recorded by Icebreaker on their Extraction album.

Other recent works include South for the National Youth Orchestra of Scotland, a seventh movement for his Handguns, a suite for Psappha, a third string quartet for the Salisbury Festival and a third study for the Bath International Guitar Festival.

He has been in demand both as a teacher and lecturer and is currently head of composition at the Royal Conservatoire of Scotland.

References

External links
Digitised scores of his musical works can be viewed through the Five Centuries of Scottish Music collection hosted by AHDS Performing Arts

1965 births
20th-century classical composers
21st-century classical composers
Academics of the University of St Andrews
Alumni of the University of York
Living people
Scottish classical composers
British male classical composers
20th-century Scottish musicians
Musicians from Dundee
20th-century British composers
20th-century British male musicians
21st-century British male musicians